Black Holes in the Sand is a mini-album by the British singer-songwriter Gravenhurst, released shortly after his second album Flashlight Seasons on Warp Records in 2004. It features a cover-version of Hüsker Dü's song "Diane".

Track listing
 "Black Holes In The Sand" - 7:26
 "Flowers In Her Hair" - 6:19
 "Still Water" - 5:48
 "Winter Moon" - 4:31
 "Diane " - 4:13
 "Flashlight Seasons" - 3:20

References

2004 albums
Gravenhurst (band) albums
Warp (record label) albums